Haemoproteus crumenium is a haemoproteid parasite first described in 1905. Birds of the family Ciconiidae serve as the host. From an early stage of development it tends to take up a lateral position within infected cells. While it usually has an irregular outline while developing, by maturity it has clearly rounded ends. Even fully-grown it almost never takes up more than two-thirds of the cell it hosts in.

References

Parasites
Haemosporida